Deer Park is a suburb in Melbourne, Victoria, Australia,  west of the Melbourne central business district, located within the City of Brimbank local government area. Deer Park recorded a population of 18,145 at the 2021 census.

History

The suburb was originally named Kororoit Creek, after the creek running through the suburb but was renamed after the Melbourne Hunt Club used the area to house their stock of game deer. The original Hunt Club building still stands on Ballarat Road, next to the Deer Park sports oval and is now a community centre. The Hunt Club was opened on Saturday, 11 July 1885.
The Post Office opened in 1878 as Kororoit Creek, and was renamed Deer Park in 1889.

Following the discovery of gold in Ballarat and Bendigo, to the west, there became a great demand for explosives. Deer Park was chosen as the site of Melbourne's first explosives factory, commenced by Jones Scott and Co in about 1874 and later reformed as Australian Explosives and Chemical Co, then Nobel (Australasia), Imperial Chemical Industries of Australia and New Zealand (ICIANZ) and most recently Orica. The site was chosen for its isolation, as it was several miles from the outskirts of Melbourne. The availability of water in Kororoit Creek was also a factor. In the 1920s, Nobel constructed a number of houses around its factory for workers and managers, expanding the former rural village into a substantial industrial suburb.

A fatal accident at the factory in 1923 led to production of black powder being stopped. In 1928, Imperial Chemical Industries of Australia and New Zealand (ICI, now Orica) took control of the factory. A new Black Powder factory was built in Deer Park in 1936 and enlarged during World War II. Charcoal from Australian timbers also began to be manufactured.

Suburban expansion in the 1920s was slowed during the 1930s depression, but in the post war period the suburb expanded rapidly. With labour shortages and a large demand for products during the post-war boom, ICI commenced housing development in Deer Park to attract workers to the area and many of the surrounding streets are named for localities in the UK, where ICI had operations.

Transport
Deer Park railway station is on the Serviceton railway line. The station is also served by trains running via the Regional Rail Link which forms part of the Geelong line. RRL also completed a minor upgrade to the station and that portion of the Serviceton line, and the junction between the RRL and Melton line is situated three kilometres west of Deer Park station, just beyond the Robinsons Road level crossing.

The electrification of the train line to Deer Park was expected to occur in the 1980s, however the project has been ignored by successive State Governments. Many residents believe the delay in upgrading the train line is related to the fact that Deer Park is situated in one of the safest Labor seats in the country.

Melbourne bus routes 215, 400, 420, 422, 426 and 456 service the area, with the 422 and 420 servicing the Deer Park station.

The main road through Deer Park is Ballarat Road, which carries traffic between Melbourne and Ballarat, Victoria's third largest city. Station Road intersects north–south with Ballarat Road and is a major local route. The Deer Park Bypass, completed in 2009, allows motorists to avoid the suburban streets of Deer Park on their journey from Melbourne to Caroline Springs, Ballarat and beyond.

Facilities

Education
Deer Park boasts two public primary schools, a Catholic primary school, and a secondary college.
 Deer Park North Primary School
 Deer Park West Primary School
 St Peter Chanel School
 Victoria University Secondary College - Junior Campus

Flora and fauna

Kororoit Creek is located on the northern boundary of the suburb. This area (particularly in the West) has been home to large healthy populations of native reptiles for thousands of years, including Tiger snake, Eastern Blue-tongued Lizard, Stump-tailed skink and Eastern brown snake. Unfortunately due to development these species are now rarely seen in the area.

Due to more recent development of the Cairnlea estate and improved vegetation on the banks of Kororoit Creek, native species of frogs have taken advantage and have taken up residents in the new wetlands and lakes. The Common Eastern Froglet and even the now endangered Growling Grass Frog have been seen and heard in the new wetlands and around Kororoit Creek.

 Kororoit Creek Trail

Prison

The Deer Park Metropolitan Women's Correctional Centre, which opened on 15 August 1996, was the first privately-owned and -operated prison in Victoria. It transferred to public ownership on 3 October 2000, the government took control of the facility, and it was renamed the Dame Phyllis Frost Centre, after prison welfare campaigner Phyllis Frost. As of 2022 it is run by Corrections Victoria.

Today

On the southern outskirts of the suburb there are large farm properties which have now being developed for housing under the development names Brimbank Gardens and St Andrews Field. This area surrounds Mount Derrimut, which saw the relocation of the Sunshine Golf Club to allow its former location, east of Fitzgerald Road, to be redeveloped as housing.

The suburb has an Australian Rules football team competing in the Western Region Football League, a cricket club and a tennis club.

Notable residents
 Marlene Kairouz
 Nathan Phillips (actor)
 Marilyn Anderson, fellow of the Australian Academy of Science

See also
 City of Sunshine – Deer Park was previously within this former local government area.

References

Suburbs of Melbourne
Suburbs of the City of Brimbank